Wong Ching (born 18 August 1980) is a Hong Kong table tennis player. She competed in the women's singles event at the 2000 Summer Olympics.

References

External links
 

1980 births
Living people
Hong Kong female table tennis players
Olympic table tennis players of Hong Kong
Table tennis players at the 2000 Summer Olympics
Place of birth missing (living people)
Asian Games medalists in table tennis
Asian Games bronze medalists for Hong Kong
Medalists at the 1998 Asian Games
Table tennis players at the 1998 Asian Games
Table tennis players at the 2002 Asian Games
21st-century Hong Kong women